Piotr Paziński may refer to:

 Piotr Paziński (writer) (born 1973), Polish writer
 Piotr Paziński (taekwondo) (born 1987), Polish taekwondo athlete